Alexander Crescenzi was a seventeenth-century mathematician, translator, and scholar living in Rome. He was a Jewish convert to Christianity.

Crescenzi became celebrated on account of his report, which he edited with mathematical notes, on the 1660 eruption of Mount Vesuvius. He also translated the Tradado de Chocolate ("Treatise on Chocolate") of Antonio Colmener de Ledesma from Spanish into Italian, published in Rome in 1667 with notes by Alexander Vitrioli.

References

 

17th-century Italian mathematicians
17th-century Italian writers
17th-century Italian male writers
Converts to Christianity from Judaism
Italian people of Jewish descent
People of Italian-Jewish descent
Writers from Rome